Magod Falls is a group of waterfalls in Karnataka, India, where the river Bedti falls from a height of nearly  in two steps.

See also

 List of waterfalls in India
 List of waterfalls in India by height

References

http://www.karnatakaholidays.com/magod-falls.php

Waterfalls of Karnataka
Tourist attractions in Uttara Kannada district
Geography of Uttara Kannada district